KSAA may refer to:

 KSAA-LD, a low-power television station (channel 10, virtual 28) licensed to serve San Antonio, Texas, United States
 Shively Field (ICAO code KSAA)